Stages is the seventh studio album by American singer Josh Groban. Consisting of songs from Broadway musicals, it was released on April 28, 2015. The album has sold 502,000 copies in the US as of October 2015. Stages received a nomination for Best Traditional Pop Vocal Album at the 58th Annual Grammy Awards.  Stages Live received a nomination in the same category a year later.

Track listing

Personnel
 Josh Groban – vocals
 Chuck Berghofer – bass guitar
 Randy Waldman – piano
 Andy Selby – programming
 Tal Bergman – drums, additional percussion, drum programming
 Dean Parks – guitar
 Mary Webster – programming
 Ruslan Sirota – piano
 Vinnie Colaiuta – drums
 Jerry McPherson – electric guitar
 Craig Nelson – bass guitar
 Bernie Herms – keyboards, piano, producer
 Dan Needham – drums
 Alex Kovacs – programming
 Bryan Sutton – acoustic guitar

Charts

Weekly charts

Year-end charts

Certifications

!scope="row"|Worldwide
|
|1,000,000+

References

2015 albums
Josh Groban albums
Reprise Records albums